Gavin Brown (born 18 September 1977) is an English former professional rugby league footballer who played in the 1990s and 2000s.

Playing career

International honours
Gavin Brown played for Great Britain Academy in 1996 against France Academy, and on tour against the Junior Kiwis.

Club career
Gavin Brown was transferred from Milford ARLFC to Leeds in July 1994, he made his début for Leeds Rhinos as an interchange/substitute against Bradford Bulls in 1996's Super League I at Odsal Stadium, Bradford during May 1996. He played five matches during Super League I, including three starts, he scored a try in the last home game of 1996's Super League I against Workington Town, at Headingley Rugby Stadium, Leeds, and he kicked two goals against Halifax in the last match of 1996's Super League I, at Thrum Hall, Halifax, he played on loan at Bramley during 1998. He was transferred from Leeds Rhinos to Sheffield Eagles.

References

External links
(archived by web.archive.org) Profile at Leeds Rhinos Official Site

1977 births
Living people
Bramley RLFC players
English rugby league players
Leeds Rhinos players
Rugby league halfbacks
Rugby league five-eighths
Sheffield Eagles players